Maayavi is a 2005 Indian Tamil-language action dramedy film directed by Singampuli that stars Suriya and Jyothika who plays a fictional version of herself, whilst Vijayakanth makes a cameo. The film's score and soundtrack were composed by Devi Sri Prasad. The plot is not loosely based on the novel The Fan Club by Irving Wallace.

Plot

Abhes Balaiya (Suriya), the guide conman thief, is footloose and fancy-free. He and his acolyte Sathyaraj (Sathyan) have no hangups in life. Balaiya’s problems start when he and Sathyaraj land up in a huge villa on the beachfront. It is actually actress Jyothika’s (Jyothika) house. When they realize it, they want to replace what they have taken. As it happens, the actress catches them and creates a huge issue out of it. For their efforts, they are put behind bars. Jyothika does not like Balaiya at all. Balaiya goes out to take revenge on her and kidnap her. Just about when the whole industry and her family tries to trace Jyothika, she understands the real Balaiya. In the end, Balaiya comes to see her and gives her a gift, which is the photographs they took together.

Cast

Suriya as Abhes Balayya
Jyothika as Jyothika (Jo)
Sathyan as Sathyaraj
Ramji as Balu
Himani Shivpuri as Jothika's mother
Sangili Murugan as Asari
Aarthi as Constable Ehswari 
Shanmugarajan as Shanmugam
Besant Ravi
Srilekha Rajendran as Asari's wife
Vishnupriya as Sigappi
S. Ramana Girivasan as Inspector Neelakandan
Vijayakanth as himself (Special appearance)
Roja as herself (Special appearance)
K. S. Ravikumar as himself (Special appearance)
R. B. Choudary as himself (Special appearance)
Vikram Dharma himself (Special appearance)
Rocky Rajesh as himself (Special appearance)
Pandiarajan as himself (Special appearance)
R. Sundarrajan as himself (Special appearance)
A. K. Veerasami as himself (Special appearance)
 Yash as Bantu (special appearance)
 Dhanush as Somasundaram (special appearance)
 Prithviraj Sukumaran as Parampara/Vishu (special appearance)
 Mammootty as Agent 1

Production
Director Bala forayed into production with this film. Jyotika dubbed for herself.

Soundtrack

The film's soundtrack, was scored by Devi Sri Prasad, marking his first collaboration with Suriya. Devi Sri Prasad reused the songs "Gongura Ura Thotakada" and "Mass to Pettunkute Madathadi Poddi" (Silakemo) from Venky and reused them as "Kaathadi Pole" and "Tamizh Naattil", respectively. The song "Kaathadi Pole" is similar to "Thamarai Poovukkum" from Pasumpon (1995).

Release
The satellite rights of the film were sold to Jaya TV. The Hindu wrote how the idea of an actress being kidnapped was present in the film Vaaname Ellai. Behindwoods noted that "Surya has given a superb performance. Jyothika is cute but does her bit of overacting". Biz Hat wrote "The downside of the film lies in the second half when the action shifts to a room with three characters only. A more innovative way could have made the film more interesting and racy." Chennai Online gave a negative review citing "It's meant to be a total comic entertainer, but the comedy being mostly juvenile, it starts grating on your nerves after a time." The film was dubbed in Telugu as Kidnap (2006).

References

External links 
 

2005 films
2000s Tamil-language films
Films scored by Devi Sri Prasad
Indian black comedy films